Lake Lenore, also known as Lenore Lake, is a lake in Grant County, Washington, United States. It is a 1,670-acre (680 ha) lake formed by the Missoula Floods in the lower Coulee just north of the town of Soap Lake, Washington. It is situated between Alkali Lake to the north and Soap Lake to the south. The lake is rather narrow, but long. The length of the lake runs north–south alongside State Route 17 leading from near the city of Soap Lake to Coulee City.

Lenore Canyon is a coulee associated with the development of the Scablands.

One of the interesting areas around Lake Lenore is the Lenore Caves. Located at the northern end of the lake, the Lenore Caves are a series of overhangs along the cliffs at the lake. They exist in one of the largest volcanic regions on Earth.

Lenore Caves 

The Lenore Caves were formed by the plucking of basalt from the walls of the coulees by the Missoula floods and are geologically different from most caverns. They were later used as shelters by prehistoric humans.

The trail is accessible from State Route 17 along Lake Lenore via a road to a parking area.

History 
On January 13, 1947, the U.S. War Assets Administration disposed of drums of sodium into Lake Lenore.

References 

 Washington State Department of Ecology, Lenore Lake

External links 

Lenore
Lenore
Tourist attractions in Grant County, Washington